The Strait of Sicily (also known as Sicilian Strait, Sicilian Channel, Channel of Sicily, Sicilian Narrows and Pantelleria Channel; ; ,   or  ) is the strait between Sicily and Tunisia.

Deep currents in the strait flow from east to west, and the current nearer the surface travels from west to east. This unusual water flow is of interest to oceanographers.

There are regular ferries between Sicily and Tunis across the Strait of Sicily.

The island of Pantelleria lies in the middle of the strait.

The Strait of Sicily is located between, at the eastern side, Tunisia and the Malta Bank and on the northern side, Sicily, Italy. Within the Central Mediterranean sea it is one of the topographically complex regions. With a length of 600 km it connects the Eastern and Western Mediterranean basins. The strait is delimited by two systems; at the eastern side it is connected with the Ionian Sea, south of the Malta Bank with a sill of 560 m deep, and, on the western side, two passages connect the strait with the Western Mediterranean basin. The passage or channel more closely to Sicily is narrow and around 430 m deep while the channel at the side of Tunisia is broader and shallower with a maximum depth of 365 m. Due to this particular bathymetry with two different channels, the strait is called a "two-sill strait". In the central region the strait is around 50 km to 100 km wide and 700 m to 900 m deep, but some parts consist of trenches of  even 1800 m deep.

A tunnel is proposed to link Tunisia and Sicily as nowadays ferries cross the Strait regularly.

Flows 
At the surface and in the upper 200 m the strait consists of an eastward flow provided by the Modified Atlantic Water (MAW). Underneath this eastward flow, the Levantine Intermediate Water (LIW) flows in westward direction. Just above the bottom of the Strait a relative small flow has been observed. This vein follows the same route as LIW but consists of different characteristics.  The water flow is named 'transitional Eastern Mediterranean Deep Water' (tEMDW)  and contains fresher, colder and denser (with a potential seawater density, σθ,  of around 29.10) water than the LIW.  In the Ionian Sea it fills the transitional layer between the Eastern Mediterranean Deep Water and the LIW. This dense water exits the strait at a depth of 300 m at the sill and sinks down, because of its higher density than the LIW, till 1800 m when reaching the Tyrrhenian Sea flowing along the Sicilian slope. This sharp sinking down of the dense water flow is a topic of interest among oceanographers. A second topic of interest regarding this little tEMDW flow is that it crosses the midline of the strait, more precisely the Malta sill. When the dense water flow reaches the western sill, it flows along the Tunisian coast instead of the Sicilian shelf. The water mass flows at a shallow depth of 300 m, while beneath the LIW, the tEMDW flows westward. Further downstream, the LIW has lower velocities and the dense water flow returns to the geostrophic position located naturally along the Sicilian coast. Here the dense water sinks into the deeper ocean sea, around 1500 m–1850 m. This inversion of the interface slope is possible because the buoyancy and Coriolis forces are balancing each other in a so-called 'geostrophic balance' which is possible because of the flow velocities of both LIW and EMDW.

The tEMDW shows little variations in height, width and path and is thus geometrically quite stable.

Dynamics 
The Central Mediterranean can be characterized by looking at differences in spatial and temporal scale. Three scales are common to use among oceanographers.

The first is the mesoscale with a horizontal scale around ten kilometers and periods of days till a maximum of ten days. The sea can be influenced within the mesoscale by wind stress, topography and by internal dynamical processes. Boundary currents and jets can be created by these processes which can evolve into vortices and filament patterns that can interact with large scale flows.

The second is the sub-basin scale with scales of 200 km till 300 km. This scale represents two dense water veins; the Atlantic Tunisian Current (ATC) which flows along the African coast and the Atlantic Ionian Stream (AIS) along the Sicilian coast. The AIS flows mainly eastward which can create upwelling on the Adventure Bank (AB) and the southern Sicilian coast. Upwelling is found to be the most intense during summer when the AIS is also relatively stronger than in other seasons. Due to the upwelling these coasts are of great interests of fishery. The ATC shows a specific path in winter while the route is less clearly-marked during summer.

The last common used scale is the large Mediterranean Basin scale which includes the thermohaline circulation. The thermohaline circulation in the Strait of Sicily is anti-estuarine and is driven by, at one site, the fresh waters entering from the Gibraltar Strait and on the other side, the negative freshwater budget from the Mediterranean Basin. Also the westward LIW in the intermediate layer and less saltier eastward Atlantic water on top are considered in this scale.

The outflow of dense-water-masses characteristics of the Strait of Sicily are not stable but have been found to change interannually.  Also the thermohaline circulation showed changes in structure and stratification. These changes were caused by deep water formed in the Aegean Sea which replaced the water formed in the Adriatic during the 1990s. This dense water caused enhanced salinity and temperatures in the Aegean Sea for a few years creating the deep/mediate Mediterranean overturning perturbation which has been given the name of Eastern Mediterranean Transient (EMT).  The EMT is the major perturbation of the circulation and water mass aspects in this area since systematic observational data is available (1950s). The effect of the EMT on the Strait of Sicily was a freshening of the surface waters.

Another important circulation mechanism that exists in the Strait of Sicily is the Biomodal Oscillating System (BiOS)  
Which is a feedback mechanism between the Ionic and the Adriatic sea.  The thermohaline properties of the Adriatic Sea show quasi-decadal oscillations that are related to the circulation of the Ionian Sea. The upper-layer of the northern Ionian Sea shows circulations that vary between a cyclonic movement, corresponding advection of waters from the Eastern Mediterranean with very saline waters and low nutrients (oligotrophic water), and anticyclonic movement which results in saline and copiotroph (nutrient-rich) waters from the Western Mediterranean towards the Adriatic. The density of the dense waters that flow from the Adriatic Sea into the northern Ionian Sea highly depends on the type of circulation (cyclonic, or anticyclonic) in the Ionian Sea and at the other hand influences the vorticity in the Ionian Sea itself resulting in a feedback mechanism. BiOS is one of the dominant mechanisms influencing biochemical processes in the Adriatic and therefore has great impact on the organisms within this sea and in the strait.

Levantine intermediate water circulation 
Through the strait of Sicily passes the Levantine Intermediate Water (LIW). The LIW is a westward flowing water mass in the intermediate layers (from 200 m till 400 m) formed in the Levantine basin, the most eastern part of the Mediterranean sea and ending in the strait of Gibraltar and the Atlantic Ocean. The LIW is characterized by high salinity and temperature. This high salinity concentrations is one of the important factors for the formation of the deep water in the Southern Adriatic and the Gulf of Lions.

During the past years (measured from 1993 till 1998) the potential temperature and salinity of the LIW have decreased significantly. This change in thermohaline properties of the LIW is in agreement with another event that occurred in the 1990s which is the uplifting of the colder and less saline deep waters in the Eastern Mediterranean referred as the Eastern Mediterranean Transient (EMT).

Migrants 
Pantelleria is an Italian island located in the Strait of Sicily around 64 km from Tunisia. Nowadays the island is one of the destinations migrants, mostly from Tunisia, try to reach. Sometimes over 200 people in only two days cross the strait in little boats.

Winds 
The winds that are found above the Strait of Sicily are the two Mediterranean winds: Sirocco, bringing dry and warm air from the South East and Mistral, bringing cold air from the northwest.

Biology 
The Strait of Sicily is rich in biodiversity due to its different water currents. Also its geographical  position between the Eastern and Western Mediterranean contributes to the high ecological importance of the strait. Warm temperature and tropical species from the Lavantin basin cross the strait. The vast variety in species cannot only be found near the surface and coasts but also the deep water contains communities of vulnerable species as the Scleractinia, Antipatharians, gorgonians and red corals.

The habitat of one of the corals in the strait, the Corallium rubrum, family of the Coralliidae (Anthozoa, Gorgonacea) is between a few meters to 120 meters deep. Its bright red calcific axis has been used for jewelry from ancient times. Although extinction of these corals is not the case yet because of high productivity in this ecosystem, a decline has been observed in the shallow waters.

These corrals are part of an initiative of worldwide conservation. During the Conference of the Parties of CITES number 14 (CoP14) two workshops were decided to be organized about the corals in the Pacific and Mediterranean.

Among the species that are fished at high rates, are the Cephalopod family. These molluscans, especially the species O. Vulgaris, are of interest both for industrial and artisanal fisheries.

Due to high biodiversity, productivity rates and importance of the different species for the ecosystem, the Mediterranean Sea and the Strait of Sicily are becoming of more interest for researchers during the recent years.

Also regarding the current climate change, information can be gained by researching the changes in biodiversity in the Strait of Sicily.

Volcanic activity 

Due to the natural position of the Strait of Sicily, above the conjunction of the Eurasian and African tectonic plate, volcanic activity occurs in the strait.

The volcanic activity is mainly focused on the islands Pantelleria and Linosa. A climax in volcanic activity was found in the Pleistocene. Although minor submarine eruptions can still be found, mostly located on the seafloor along the northwest and southeast regional faults.

During historical times some seamounts did erupt while other seamounts have been covered by Pliocene-Quaternary sediments.

The submarine volcanoes are located in the Adventure Plateau, Graham and Nameless Banks. In 1831 a submarine volcano erupted on the Graham Bank at a depth of around 200 m. This eruption gave rise to the Graham Island 65 m above sea level. Also in the year 1863 this volcano erupted, whereas the youngest eruption in the region was in 1891 around 5 km north of Pantelleria. At the southeast of Graham Bank, at the Pinne Bank an emission was observed in 1941.

See also
 Italy–Tunisia Delimitation Agreement

References

External links

Geography of Sicily
Sicily
Sicily
Bodies of water of Tunisia
Straits of the Mediterranean Sea
Italy–Tunisia border
International straits